Never End may refer to:

"Never End" (song), by Namie Amuro, 2000
Never End, a novel by Åke Edwardson

See also
"Neva End", a 2012 song by Future